7 is the seventh studio album by American dream pop band Beach House, released on May 11, 2018, through Sub Pop. It follows the B-Sides and Rarities compilation album released in 2017, which served as a proverbial "cleaning out the closet" to pave the way for a new creative process.

The album saw the group departing from longtime producer Chris Coady and instead collaborating with Sonic Boom, whilst not having a producer "in the traditional sense". The recording of the album lasted over eleven months, as opposed to the speedy process of previous efforts, beginning in the duo's home studio in Baltimore and finishing at Carriage House and Palmetto Studio. 7 received acclaim from music critics, who praised the adventurous nature of the record and the consistency of the band, with some calling it the duo's best album to date.

Five singles were released from the album: "Lemon Glow", "Dive", "Dark Spring", "Black Car", and "Lose Your Smile".

Recording
Unlike with previous records, Beach House took their time with the recording process of 7. Instead of one long studio session, they recorded when inspired by batches of songs, which resulted in five mini-sessions over the course of eleven months throughout 2017. All of the songs on the album began in the duo's home studio in Baltimore called Apple Orchard Studios, and were finished at Carriage House in Stamford, CT, with "Lose Your Smile" and "Woo" being recorded at Palmetto Studio in Los Angeles. The band stated that their goal throughout the recording process of the album was "rebirth and rejuvenation," continuing: "We wanted to rethink old methods and shed some self-imposed limitations. In the past, we often limited our writing to parts that we could perform live. On 7, we decided to follow whatever came naturally. As a result, there are some songs with no guitar, and some without keyboard. There are songs with layers and production that we could never recreate live, and that is exciting to us. Basically, we let our creative moods, instead of instrumentation, dictate the album's feel."

The band also stated that 7 did not have a producer in the traditional sense, which let the ideas drive the creativity and not any one person's creative process. The band's touring drummer since 2016, James Barone, played on the entire record. They also worked with Peter Kember, known by the stage name Sonic Boom, who helped "in the shedding of conventions and in helping to keep the songs alive, fresh and protected from the destructive forces of recording studio over-production/over-perfection."

Themes and influences
Thematically, 7 often deals with "the beauty that arises in dealing with darkness; the empathy and love that grows from collective trauma; the place one reaches when they accept rather than deny." The album's title itself simply represents it being the duo's seventh studio album, saying they "hoped its simplicity would encourage people to look inside. No title using words that we could find felt like an appropriate summation of the album," although they later mentioned that the number 7 represents some interesting connections in numerology, which further inspired them in naming the album as such. Edie Sedgwick inspired the black-and-white pop art visuals and psych heavy sound of the album. "I was drawn to somebody like Edie because she has beauty on the outside but she also struggled with her mask," Legrand stated.

Legrand described the album's sound as a natural progression and a product of her maturing as an artist, saying, "There were a lot of new and different things that went into making this record. But I think that the way that we wrote, and how we recorded while we wrote, really increased the speed of capturing ideas and gave us a lot more freedom than previous records... I think every time you do something, you become more adept at it. You sort of know better and don't get fooled the same way you got fooled when you were younger."

The band cited the "societal insanity" during 2016 and 2017 as a deep influence on the creation of the record, elaborating: "there is quite a bit of chaos happening in these songs, and a pervasive dark field that we had little control over. The discussions surrounding women's issues were a constant source of inspiration and questioning. The energy, lyrics and moods of much of this record grew from ruminations on the roles, pressures and conditions that our society places on women, past and present. The twisted double edge of glamour, with its perils and perfect moments, was an endless source."

Release and promotion
The band released "Lemon Glow" on February 15, 2018, and announced it as the lead single from the then-unannounced album, which they stated would be released "later this spring". They released a second single, "Dive", on March 7, and shared a pre-order of the album, revealing its title, cover art, track listing and release date. They released "Dark Spring" as the third single on April 2 alongside a music video directed by Zia Anger, and "Black Car" was released as the fourth single on May 2, with a music video directed by Legrand's brother, Alistair Legrand, being released on June 18.

Sub Pop customers who pre-ordered 7 were given access to an exclusive stream of the album which occurred on April 27, two weeks prior to the release of the album, via Sub Pop's website. The album was officially released on CD, vinyl, cassette, digital download and streaming services on May 11, 2018, through Sub Pop worldwide, with the exception of Europe and Australia/New Zealand, where it was released through Bella Union and Mistletone, respectively. An animated album visualizer directed by San Charoenchai was uploaded to the band's YouTube channel upon the album's release, with each song being accompanied by psychedelic animations in black and white.

Beach House performed a live in-studio session on KCRW in Los Angeles on May 15, and were the musical guests on Jimmy Kimmel Live! on May 16, with a late night TV performance of "Drunk in LA".

The band headed on a North American and European tour in support of the album, beginning in Chattanooga, Tennessee on April 30, 2018. They later announced Australian tour dates, which include shows between February and March 2019.

On October 23, 2018, the band released a limited edition 7-inch vinyl of "Lose Your Smile" from 7 as the A-side and a new track from the recording sessions of 7 titled "Alien" as the B-side. The vinyl was originally sold on the band's European tour in dates from September to October. In addition, "Alien" was released as a standalone single to digital download and streaming services.

Critical reception

At Metacritic, which assigns a normalized rating out of 100 to reviews from mainstream publications, 7 received an average score of 80, based on 29 reviews, indicating "generally favorable reviews". In her review for The Independent, Roisin O'Connor wrote, "Instead of limiting themselves, Beach House are finally embracing all of their creative moments, which have inevitably challenged them to become better artists." The Line of Best Fits Chris Taylor stated that 7 is "as much of a reinvention as we're likely to get from Beach House but even those small steps to the left offer up yet another captivating record," and finished his review saying, "By this point, we really should just stop worrying about when Beach House are going to go stale because it's still nowhere near happening. It's still a pleasure to be lost in their world." Writing for Stereogum, Gabriela Tully Claymore called 7 the duo's "boldest album yet". Eugenie Johnson of The Skinny wrote, "While they may not have completely achieved seventh heaven here, 7 is still a solid first step heralding Beach House's next phase."

Rolling Stones Simon Vozick-Levinson called 7 "a radical blast of psychedelic pop bliss," saying "These are big songs, full of wonder, and Beach House know it. Seven albums in, they're at the start of something new." Jayson Greene of Pitchfork praised the album, writing "Beach House remain masters of the indefinable and their seventh album is their heaviest and most immersive-sounding of their career." AllMusic critic Heather Phares wrote, "Throughout 7, Beach House feel more concerned with capturing moments fully rather than conforming to notions of what a cohesive album is. That these songs sound like they came from different albums is ultimately more refreshing than disorienting, and the excitement that courses through each track is palpable." David Sackllah of Consequence of Sound said, "7 finds the band taking risks and unlearning the parameters they had set for themselves to craft their most adventurous record yet," concluding: "By retooling their sound and shaking off any complacency that may have settled in, Beach House make their claim as one of the preeminent indie rock bands of the decade." Leah Greenblatt of Entertainment Weekly said "7s artful wooziness is hardly new, but for Beach House, it feels like home." Frank Guan of Vulture called 7 the duo's best album yet, writing "the darkness and directness of its sound, combined with Legrand's customary sibylline vocals, add up to something welcome and unprecedented in the Beach House catalogue — their best album in an already impressive set."

Kelsey J. Waite of The A.V. Club wrote, "With 7, Legrand and Scally have gotten freer themselves. This is the sound of a band that knows itself extremely well and yet, in seeking outside perspectives and embracing imperfection, has discovered a whole new level to explore. If this album feels like an alternate-reality Beach House, it's because Legrand and Scally have altered their reality." Tiny Mix Tapes Matthew Neale gave 7 a perfect score and called it the duo's greatest album. Clash lauded the record, writing: "The Baltimore duo have somehow gifted us their masterpiece, and though the rain outside has now stopped, new heavens have opened." Joe Goggins of Drowned in Sound said that 7 is "a record that gets closer to the band's self-imposed boundaries than they ever have before without really threatening to break them down." Flood Magazines Alex Swhear praised the record's "expansive, almost oceanic aura."

Track listing

Personnel
Credits adapted from the liner notes of 7.

Beach House – arrangement, performance; production, engineering
Victoria Legrand
Alex Scally 
 James Barone – live drums ; engineering 
 Sonic Boom – accordion , drill ; production
 Mikhail Pivovarov – engineering
 David Tolemei – engineering, additional editing and recording
 Jason Quever – engineering 
 Alan Moulder – mixing
 Caesar Edmunds – engineering 
 Greg Calbi – mastering
 Post Typography – album art, design

Charts

Release history

Notes

References

2018 albums
Beach House albums
Sub Pop albums
Psychedelic pop albums